2021 Countdown stabbing may refer to:

2021 Dunedin Countdown stabbing, which occurred in Dunedin, New Zealand, on 10 May
2021 Auckland Countdown stabbing, which occurred in Auckland, New Zealand, on 3 September